Corona Symphony Orchestra (CSO), is a 501(c)(3) non-profit orchestra based in Corona, California.

CSO was formed in 2008 by executive board member Don Kindred. CSO is currently directed by Marco A. Mejia, a  founding member. CSO performs at civic events and participates in music education through the Corona Symphony Conservatory.

CSO is a member of the Association of California Symphony Orchestras (ACSO) and Arts Alive.

References

External links
http://www.coronasymphonyorchestra.org/
http://www.pe.com/articles/corona-689415-kindred-orchestra.html
http://www.artsalivecouncil.org/corona-symphony-orchestra/

Symphony orchestras
Orchestras based in California